The Life Quality Index (LQI) is a calibrated compound social indicator of human welfare that reflects the expected length of life in good health and enhancement of the quality of life through access to income. The Life Quality Index combines two primary social indicators: the expectancy of healthy life at birth, E, and the real gross domestic product per person, G, corrected for purchasing power parity as appropriate. Both are widely available and accurate statistics.

Basic concept 

The three components of the Life Quality Index, G, E and K reflect three important human concerns: the creation of wealth, the duration of life in good health and the time available to enjoy life. The amount of life available to enjoy wealth acts as a multiplying factor upon the value of that wealth. Conversely, the amount of income one has to enjoy that available lifetime acts as a multiplier on the expected duration of life.

Unlike the United Nations’ Human Development Index (HDI), the LQI is derived rigorously from the economics of human welfare. Like the HDI it can be used to rank nations in order of human welfare (development, quality of life). However, more important and unlike the HDI, it can also serve as an objective function to be used in setting national or corporate goals for managing risk and to guide effective allocation of society’s scarce resources for the mitigation of risks to life or health. The LQI is a summary indicator of net benefit to society for improving the overall public welfare by reducing risks to life in a cost-effective manner (Lind et al. 1992).

In the accounting and assessment of human development, we can view the role of individuals as the principal means, or contributors, to development as well as the ends. For example, the productivity of an individual contributes directly to the aggregate wealth creation in a society. However, the income so generated (to whomsoever it may accrue) increases the capacity of society to provide the necessary means such as the required infrastructure (hospitals, schools, clean water, safe roads and structures). The adequacy of the infrastructure in turn benefits the individual via access to quality health and environment, education and means for culturalexpression and enrichment. The LQI enhances our decision-making capacity in the management of risks to life and health. It brings into sharp focus the choices and trade-offs we have to make between extension of life and creation of productive wealth.

Formulation 

The mathematical expression for the Life-Quality Index L is:

Showing the LQI, L as a power function of E, the health-adjusted life expectancy (HALE) at birth and G, the Gross Domestic Product (GDP) per person. The parameter K is a constant based on time-budget studies available for many countries. K is approximately equal to 5.0 for developed nations. (Rackwitz 2008).

Societal Capacity to Commit Resources (SCCR) 
The LQI has been used to determine an acceptable level of expenditure that can be justifiably incurred on behalf of the public interest in exchange for a small reduction in the risk of death that results in improved life-quality for all. This limit of benefit can be considered as the societal capacity to commit resources to sustainable risk reduction. Suppose a portion of GDP, dG, is invested in implementing a program that affects public risk, thus modifying the life expectancy by a small amount dE. There is a net benefit if there is a net increase in LQI, dL. This criterion can be derived from the definition of L as:

from which the limit of benefit, the Societal Capacity to Commit Resources (SCCR) to sustainable risk reduction, follows as:

In conjunction with an actuarial life table the SCCR serves to evaluate life-saving interventions in place of the discredited “value of a statistical life.”
Using data from the United Nations Development Program (UNDP 2013) for year 2011 and K=5.0, the table shows values of E (years), G (GNP per capita in 2005 $PPP), L (normalized, dimensionless), the Limit of Benefit SCCR (2005 $PPP/year/year), and the HDI for selected countries and groups of countries.

Application

The Life Quality Index is a decision tool serving to promote human development through better allocation of society’s scarce resources by reducing wasteful efforts on inefficient risk-reduction and identifying efficient alternatives.
Given that the societal capacity to commit resources is limited, the LQI is a powerful indicator of merit amongst competing but desirable goods, such as for example level of resources to be directed at air pollution vs water pollution vs low probability, high consequence risks in the distant future.

Using the Life Quality Index or SCCR to Judge Risk 
Risks influence the LQI via the age- and sex-specific mortality, calculated by changes in an actuarial life table. The safety benefit is the gain in health-adjusted life expectancy HALE, or life extension expected upon implementation of the program. The cost effects must also be evaluated, measured as the effect on the real gross domestic product per person (with refinements that could include correction for purchasing power parity for international comparisons). The net benefit of a program is measured, according to the SCCR, by the resultant increases in real gross domestic product per capita and life expectancy, weighted by K. The Life Quality Index may be thought of as a refinement of monetary measures commonly used in cost-benefit analysis.

Net Benefit Criterion for Managing Risk 
The objective is to maximize life expectancy subject to society’s capacity to commit resources in light of existing or future constraints. Reducing risk of death and disease translates into longer healthful lives. The length of life extension in good health for a population can be reliably measured as the effect on the gain in life expectancy (dE). Resources and monies (-dG) are required to achieve the gains, or increases, in life expectancy. If the resources are wisely spent, i.e., below the limit of benefit SCCR, then the gains in life expectancy will be sufficiently large that there is a net increase in the Life Quality Index (LQI). In contrast, if inordinate sums are spent on activities that do not save lives or result in only meagre life extension then there is a net decrease in the LQI.

Life Quality Index as a Tool for Managing Risk 
Through numerous case studies and worked examples, it has been shown how the Life Quality Index can be used to assist decision-makers in evaluating the effectiveness of regulations and activities aimed at reducing risk to life, health and the environment. The LQI is a versatile tool that can be used to assess a wide range of risk management problems. The examples of application of LQI include:

 the effectiveness of standards and regulations for health and safety; 
 harmonization of structural safety standards and design goals; 
 assessment of air pollution standards; 
 efficiency of life-saving interventions and estimates of the societal willingness (or capacity) to commit resources for safety.
The LQI is used in the calibration of standards by the Joint Committee on Structural Safety (see Rackwitz(2008)) and has thus found its way into currently valid standards (SIA 269 and ISO 2394).

Development of the Life Quality Index 

The concept of the Life Quality Index was first initiated at the Institute for Risk Research, University of Waterloo, Waterloo, Ontario, Canada in the early 1990s The principal investigators involved in the development of the Life Quality Index were Professors Niels Lind, Jatin Nathwani and Mahesh Pandey. Two primary publications were Lind et al. (1992) and Nathwani et al. (1997).

See also
 Manchester Short Assessment of Quality of Life 
 Gross National Happiness
 Bhutan GNH Index
 Happiness economics

References 

 Faber M.H., Lind N., Nathwani J., Thomas P. and Vrouwenvelder T. (2012). A Common Rationale for Health and Life Safety Management, OECD High Level Risk Forum, December.
 
 
 
 
 
 Nathwani J.S. (2004). Strategic Principles for Managing Risk, Keynote Lecture, Proceedings.of the 11th IFIP Conference Reliability and Optimization of Structural Systems, (eds.) 
 Maes, M.A. and Huyse, L., 13-22. 
 
 
 
 Pandey M.D. and Nathwani J.S. (2004). Discounting Models and the Life-Quality Index for the Estimation of Estimation of Societal Willingness-to-Pay for Safety. Proc. 11th IFIP Conference Reliability and Optimization of Structural Systems, (eds.) Maes, M.A. and Huyse, L., pp. 87–94. 
 
 
 
 
 

Index numbers